Yellowhammer News is an American conservative website that publishes news and political commentary pertaining to Alabama. It is owned by Yellowhammer Media. It was founded in 2011 by Alabama native Cliff Sims who left in January 2017 to work in President Donald Trump's administration as assistant communications director for White House messaging, as well as a special assistant to Trump himself. (Sims left that job after 17 months and wrote the memoir Team of Vipers about the experience.) When he left Yellowhammer, Sims sold the company to Tim Howe and John Ross, both former directors of the Alabama Republican Party.

References

External links

 (An article describing Yellowhammer News as a "relatively mature example of the attempts to create alternative local news outlets that capitalize on America’s media polarization where it dovetails with community news credibility").

American conservative websites
American news websites
Mass media in Alabama